Stenhousemuir Football Club is a Scottish football club located in Stenhousemuir, Falkirk. They are a member of the Scottish Professional Football League and currently play in Scottish League Two.

Through much of its history, the team has competed in the lower leagues of Scottish football, most recently being relegated to Scottish League Two in 2019 via the play-offs one year after being promoted to League One. They remain the only club to have competed in the professional leagues since the 20th century but never to have won a league title.

In September 2009, Stenhousemuir Football Club, Ltd. was re-registered as a Community Interest Company.

History

1884–1989 
The club claim to have been founded in 1884 following a breakaway from a local team called Heather Rangers. However this cannot be substantiated through contemporary accounts, for instance it appears Heather Rangers did not exist until much later. There was a Stenhousemuir FC in existence between 1882 and 1885 with the current club not being reported in the press until 1886.

Stenhousemuir Thistle Cricket Club was in existence c.1881. A reference to a "2nd Stenhousemuir (Windsor)", ie a reserve XI, match is made on 18 May 1882. A "Stenhousemuir (Larbert)" away match to Alloa Athletic is listed on 9 September 1882, with Vale of Bannock v Stenhousemuir Thistle on 16 September 1882.

The team line ups for these two matches (one week apart) support Stenhousemuir and Stenhousemuir Thistle as being separate clubs. Stenhousemuir were admitted to the SFA on 21 August 1883 before being struck off from the SFA on 16 August 1885 for non-payment of subscription. This club played in the Scottish Cup in 1883–84 and 1884–85. There is further reference to a Stenhousemuir "junior" team on 13 March 1884. The club were likely not formed as a breakaway from Heather Rangers as they did not exist in 1884 but more likely c.1890.

In 1890, the Warriors moved to Ochilview Park following spells at Tryst Park and Goschen Park. In the early 20th century the club had a brief spell of success, winning the Scottish Qualifying Cup twice in 1901 and 1902. In 1902–03, the club reached the Scottish Cup semi-final, losing 1–4 at home to Rangers. The 1921–22 season saw Stenhousemuir compete for the first time in senior Scottish League Football.

In 1925–26, Stenhousemuir goalkeeper Joe Shortt was offered a £50 bribe to throw a match against Broxburn United, but he rejected the offer and the Warriors won the match 6–2. A bookmaker from the Bainsford district of Falkirk, was subsequently jailed for attempted match fixing.

In 1928, the wooden grandstand at Ochilview Park burnt down in a fire, which led to a new stand being built in its place, although staircases reputedly had to be added later due to planning errors. The 1936–37 season saw the club register a record victory – a 9–2 home win against Dundee United. More than a decade later in 1949–50, a Scottish Cup quarter-final tie against East Fife drew a record crowd of 12,525 – the highest ever at Ochilview Park. On 7 November 1951, the first floodlit game between two Scottish senior teams occurred at Ochilview Park, a friendly match between Stenhousemuir and Hibernian. The floodlights had been paid for three years earlier by Tommy Douglas, a butcher in King Street, Stenhousemuir.

In the summer of 1964, Rangers revealed a plan to The Scottish Football League to remove the Warriors from the league, along with four other clubs, on the basis that they were poorest-supported clubs over the previous three seasons. Four years later, Stenhousemuir, along with Albion Rovers, Berwick Rangers, Brechin City and Stranraer, with support from a number of clubs, including Celtic, Hamilton Academical and Airdrieonians, successfully defeated the plan.

In 1972–73, the Warriors defeated Rangers 2–1 at Ibrox Stadium in Second Round 2nd leg of the Scottish League Cup. Notably, Rangers were the holders of the UEFA Cup Winners' Cup at the time. Rangers progressed 6–2 on aggregate having previously won the 1st leg 5–0 at Ochilview.

1990–present 
In 1992–93, the Club allowed their rivals Stirling Albion to groundshare at Ochilview Park. In the 1993–94 season, the Warriors were moved out of the bottom league for the first time, due to the formation of the Scottish Third Division. The mid-1990s would go on to be one of the club's most successful periods in its history.

In 1994–95 they defeated St Johnstone 4–0 and Aberdeen 2–0, both higher league opposition, en route to the Scottish Cup quarter finals. In the 1995–96 season, Stenhousemuir won the Scottish Challenge Cup, defeating Dundee United 5–4 on penalties after a goalless 90 minutes and extra time. In the process they reached their first national semi-final since season 1902–03.

In 1997–98, Stenhousemuir were relegated from the Scottish Second Division to the Scottish Third Division for the first time in the history of the club. However, the next season (1998–99) the Warriors won promotion back to the Second Division, also for the first time in the history of the club.

In 2006–07, the Club installed a new synthetic surface at Ochilview Park. It became the first in the UK to pass the FIFA 2 Star category accreditation.  A new synthetic surface was installed in the summer of 2014.

At the end of the 2008–09 season, Stenhousemuir were promoted back to the Scottish Second Division (having been relegated from there in season 2002–03) after defeating Cowdenbeath 5–4 on penalties, this after drawing 0–0 on aggregate in the play-off final.

The 2010–11 season saw the Club narrowly avoid another relegation after spending most of the season in the bottom two positions. On the final day of the season the club defeated Peterhead 3–0 to move above Alloa Athletic and therefore avoided the relegation play-offs.

In 2013 Stenhousemuir reached their second Challenge Cup Semi-Final by beating Dundee on penalties after drawing 1–1 but went on to lose 1–0 to Rangers.

In January 2014, after parting company with Martyn Corrigan, the Warriors appointed Scott Booth as their new manager.  Booth was relieved of his duties on 1 February 2015 after winning just 12 from 42 games and failing to record any back to back victories.

Assistant Manager, Brown Ferguson, took temporary charge for the second time, and the club announced on 2 April 2015 that 'Bomber' Brown would take over as manager on a full-time basis for the 2015–16 season.

After a poor season in 2016–17, the club found itself relegated to Scottish League Two. However, the club came straight back up the following season despite finishing in fourth spot, winning promotion through the play-offs after beating Queen's Park in the play-off semi-finals and then Peterhead in the final. 2018–19 saw the club relegated back to League Two after defeat to Annan Athletic in the play-offs.

Supporters and rivalries 
Stenhousemuir Supporters' Trust is the official supporters' club of Stenhousemuir FC. It is a democratic organisation based on one vote per person, and its committee is elected every year by the members. It is the largest shareholder in the club with about 11% of the shares with the aim to increase the shareholding so that no individual(s) can wrest the control of the club away from its supporters.

The club also draws much international support: the Norwegian Supporters' Club is a small supporters' organisation based in Oslo, Norway. The Supporters Club was founded on New Year's Eve 1992 by Rolf Erik Wulff, Christian Wulff and Kjell Jarslett. In 1996 it was given one share of Stenhousemuir F.C. as a recognition of their support and promotion of the club. As of today, the supporters club and its members owns about 5% of the shares in Stenhousemuir. Stenhousemuir FC also has Danish support. The Denmark-based supporters club is an unofficial Warriors fan club founded and established in the summer 2000. The fan club has approximately 30 members.

Stenhousemuir Supporters Trust, also known as The 'Warriors Supports Trust' is registered with the Financial Services Agency as a not-for-profit Industrial and Provident Society. It was established in 2003. It works with the Board of the football club and the Supporters Club to develop a more successful football club. The annual membership subscription of the Trust is £5 but Trust members can take out either a 'silver' membership of £5 a month, or a 'gold' membership of £10 a month. The cash obtained from membership of the Trust is used to buy shares the football club has for sale, and hence the club benefits financially. Since its inception the Trust has given money to the club and its members have given their time and labour towards several projects. The current Chairman of the Stenhousemuir Supporters Trust is Graeme Wallace, who is also the stadium announcer at Ochilview.

Notable fans include The Wire actor Isiah Whitlock and Monty Python star Michael Palin.

The biggest rivals are East Stirlingshire with whom they share a fierce local rivalry, as they are both from the Falkirk area and have frequently played in the same division as well as sharing the same stadium for a period.
There is a smaller rivalry with Falkirk.

Current squad and staff

First-team squad

Club staff

Board of directors 
Iain McMenemy (Chairman), David Reid (Vice Chairman), Robert Beagley, Terry Bulloch, Gordon Cook, Martin McNairney, Andy McPhate (Supporters Club Rep).

Source:

Achievements 
 Scottish Challenge Cup:
 Winners: 1995–96
 Scottish Third Division/Scottish League Two (fourth tier):
 Runners-up: 1998–99
 Promoted: 2008–09, 2017–18 (via play-offs)
 Scottish Qualifying Cup:
 Winners (2): 1900–01, 1901–02
 Stirlingshire Cup:
 Winners (11): 1899–1900, 1901–02, 1921–22, 1932–33, 1936–37, 1962–63, 1970–71, 1975–76, 1986–87, 2001–02, 2014–15
 Central Combination:
 Winners (3): 1898–99, 1900–01, 1901–02
 Midland League:
 Winners: 1895–96

Records 
 Biggest league victory: 9–2 v Dundee United, 16 April 1937. (Scottish League – Division Two)
 Biggest league defeat: 2–11 v Dunfermline Athletic, 27 September 1930. (Scottish League – Division Two)
Biggest home attendance: 12,525 v East Fife, 11 March 1950. (Scottish Cup Quarter-Final)

References

External links 
 

 
Football clubs in Scotland
Football in Falkirk (council area)
Association football clubs established in 1884
Scottish Football League teams
1884 establishments in Scotland
Scottish Challenge Cup winners
Scottish Professional Football League teams
Stenhousemuir